Port Vila Municipal Stadium is a sports stadium located in Port Vila, Vanuatu. It is the main stadium for the Port Vila Football Association's TVL League.

See also

List of rugby league stadiums by capacity

References

Football venues in Vanuatu
Port Vila
Rugby league stadiums
Amicale F.C.